This is a list of films in which the Irish Republican Army, a faction thereof or a break away organisation (whether real or fictional) is portrayed either through its plot or by a main character.

External links
 Movies with 'the Troubles' in Northern Ireland as a theme (1968 - Present)

Irish Republican Army
Irish Republicanism
 
IRA Films
IRA films
Irish Republican Army
Lists of Irish films